Calliostoma echinatum is a species of sea snail, a marine gastropod mollusk in the family Calliostomatidae.

Description
(Original description by W.H. Dall) The size of the shell varies between 5 mm and 10 mm. The small, white shell has an acute-conical shape, in general resembling Calliostoma sapidum, but less stout and solid and with wholly different sculpture. The six whorls are somewhat appressed toward the apex. The nucleus is smooth, semi-transparent, inflated, shining, remainder of shell opaque white with the following sculpture. On the upper whorls, four revolving ribs with smaller inconspicuous ones between them, crossed by faint plications (more evident on the smaller whorls). These produce nodosities which, on the four principal ribs, and especially on the third one, counting from the suture toward the base, rise to acutely pointed projections separated by an incurved scallop of about twice the width of the projections. Toward the aperture the ribs and nodosities become more equal in size. The base of the shell is flattened, impervious, sculptured with some fifteen close set flattened revolving ribs crossed by impressed radiating lines of growth. The aperture is nearly rectangular. The columella is straight, stout, not projecting, without a callus. The margin is thin, a little crenulated by the sculpture.

Distribution
This species occurs in the Gulf of Mexico and the Caribbean Sea off Cuba; in the Atlantic Ocean off Brazil at depths between 37 mm and 220 m.

References

 Rosenberg, G., F. Moretzsohn, and E. F. García. 2009. Gastropoda (Mollusca) of the Gulf of Mexico, pp. 579–699 in Felder, D.L. and D.K. Camp (eds.), Gulf of Mexico–Origins, Waters, and Biota. Biodiversity. Texas A&M Press, College Station, Texas.

External links
 

echinatum
Gastropods described in 1881